Suthirat Wongtewan, nicknamed Kung (born 17 August 1979) is a famous Thai Likay actor, Luk thung singer and film actor. He has a popular song titled "Kor Pen Pra Ek Nai Hua Jai Ther" (ขอเป็นพระเอกในหัวใจเธอ), released in 1997.

Early life and career
His birthname is Suthirat Usupha and he was born on 17 August 1979, in Chai Nat Province. He is the son of Chainarong and Taweeb Usupha. He had a job as Likay actor since he was young, and he was espak muzzle player of his birthplace. He finished his secondary class from Kuru Prachasan school, and Bachelor's degree from Ramkhamhaeng University, 
Faculty of Political Science.

He is the nephew of Jingreedkhaw Wongtewan, a famous Thai Luk thung singer, and has a younger sister named Wirada Wongtewan.

He started on stage in 1997 by persuasion of Pathin Khumprasert, and recorded his first album under the jurisdiction of record label Krung Thai Music Audio named Khor Pen Pra Ek Nai Hua Jai Ther (in English named "Want to be the hero in your heart."), and became very popular. At present, he is an artist of R-Siam, and has many popular songs recorded by R-siam including, "Rieam Rae Rae Rai", "Tephee Ban Prai", etc.

Discography

Studio albums

Krung Thai Music Audio

R-Siam

Awards
 2016 - Awards "Dao Mekhala"

References

1979 births
Living people
Suthirat Wongtewan
Suthirat Wongtewan
Suthirat Wongtewan
Suthirat Wongtewan